The Europe Zone was one of the three regional zones of the 1963 Davis Cup.

32 teams entered the Europe Zone, with the winner going on to compete in the Inter-Zonal Zone against the winners of the America Zone and Eastern Zone. Great Britain defeated Sweden in the final and progressed to the Inter-Zonal Zone.

Draw

Preliminary round

Turkey vs. Israel

Portugal vs. Luxembourg

Lebanon vs. Egypt

Ireland vs. Greece

First round

Netherlands vs. Rhodesia

Yugoslavia vs. Monaco

Austria vs. Israel

Romania vs. Switzerland

Denmark vs. Czechoslovakia

Portugal vs. Norway

Egypt vs. Chile

Finland vs. Soviet Union

Hungary vs. Belgium

Greece vs. Brazil

France vs. Poland

West Germany vs. Spain

Second round

Sweden vs. Rhodesia

Yugoslavia vs. Austria

Romania vs. South Africa

Denmark vs. Norway

Soviet Union vs. Chile

Belgium vs. Great Britain

France vs. Brazil

Spain vs. Italy

Quarterfinals

Sweden vs. Yugoslavia

Denmark vs. South Africa

Great Britain vs. Soviet Union

Spain vs. France

Semifinals

Sweden vs. South Africa

Great Britain vs. Spain

Final

Great Britain vs. Sweden

References

External links
Davis Cup official website

Davis Cup Europe/Africa Zone
Europe Zone
Davis Cup